The Ottoman periodical Davul was published in Istanbul weekly between 27 October 1908 and 27 May 1909 in a total of 24 issues. The satirical magazine was edited by Hasan Vasıf (1889-1944), an Ottoman politician and physician. The numerous satirical illustrations and caricatures deal with the Ottoman and European politics of that time. In their humorous articles the authors criticize i.a. Abdülhamid II, the whole Ottoman policies and the European way of life. In addition, excerpts of the French magazine Fantasie in French language were published in some issues.

The Chicago Ottoman Microfilms Project initiated by the University of Chicago in 1985 archived the issues of Davul.

References

External links

1908 establishments in the Ottoman Empire
1909 disestablishments in the Ottoman Empire
Defunct magazines published in Turkey
Magazines established in 1908
Magazines disestablished in 1909
Magazines published in Istanbul
Turkish-language magazines
Satirical magazines published in Turkey
Weekly magazines published in Turkey